This is a list of men's association football clubs in Poland. Currently the governing body of football in Poland is the Polish Football Association (PZPN), which is in charge of its national teams and its leagues, with the highest one being Ekstraklasa.

Current hierarchical divisional breakdowns

Clubs 
Arka Gdynia
Błękitni Stargard
Bruk-Bet Termalica Nieciecza
Chojniczanka Chojnice
Chemik Police
Chrobry Głogów
Cracovia
Cuiavia Inowrocław
Flota Świnoujście
GKS Bełchatów
GKS Jastrzębie
GKS Katowice
GKS Tychy
Górnik Konin
Górnik Łęczna
Górnik Zabrze
Gwardia Koszalin
Hetman Zamość
Hutnik Kraków
Izolator Boguchwała
Jagiellonia Białystok
Jeziorak Iława
Kmita Zabierzów
Korona Kielce
Kotwica Kołobrzeg
KSZO Ostrowiec
Lech Poznań
Lechia Gdańsk
Legia Warszawa
ŁKS Łomża
ŁKS Łódź
Miedź Legnica
MKS Przasnysz
Motor Lublin
Odra Opole
Odra Wodzisław Śląski
Olimpia Elbląg
Pelikan Łowicz
Piast Gliwice
Podbeskidzie Bielsko-Biała
Pogoń Oleśnica
Pogoń Szczecin
Polonia Bytom
Polonia Przemyśl
Polonia Słubice
Polonia Warszawa
Radomiak Radom
Raków Częstochowa
Resovia Rzeszów
RKS Radomsko
ROW Rybnik
Ruch Chorzów
Ruch Radzionków
Sandecja Nowy Sącz
Skalnik Gracze
Śląsk Świętochłowice
Śląsk Wrocław
Sokół Nisko
Stal Mielec
Stal Stalowa Wola
Stilon Gorzów Wielkopolski
Stoczniowiec Gdańsk
Stomil Olsztyn
Szczakowianka Jaworzno
Unia Janikowo
Warta Poznań
Widzew Łódź
Wigry Suwałki
Wisła Kraków
Wisła Płock
Wisłoka Dębica
Zagłębie Lubin
Zagłębie Sosnowiec
Zawisza Bydgoszcz
Ząbkovia Ząbki
Znicz Pruszków

Notable extinct teams
Amica Wronki
Dyskobolia Grodzisk Wielkopolski
Gwardia Warszawa 

Poland
 
Football clubs
Football